Surviliškis is a small town in Kaunas County in central Lithuania, 18 km from Kėdainiai, on the right bank of the Nevėžis river. In 2011 it had a population of 351. There are wooden Catholic church of Jesus (built in 1791), wooden chapel in cemetery (built in 1800), wooden cross of local crossmaking master Vincas Svirskis, wayside chapel of St. Mary, school, library, medicine station. The regional road  Kėdainiai-Krekenava-Panevėžys runs through the town.

History
The toponym Surviliškis comes from personal name Survila or Survilas.

Surviliškis Manor was first mentioned in 1500. The first church was built in 1505 and till the 19th century Surviliškis was a property of the Samogitian bishop. Since 1587 Surviliškis is known as a town. Surviliškis Manor was parcelled in 1929. During Soviet era it was a selsovet center and "Švyturys" ('lighthouse') kolkhoz center.

Demography

Images

References

Kėdainiai District Municipality
Towns in Kaunas County